SpaceIL is an Israeli organization, established in 2011, that competed in the Google Lunar X Prize (GLXP) contest to land a spacecraft on the Moon.

SpaceIL successfully launched its Beresheet lander on 22 February 2019 at 01:45 UTC; it entered lunar orbit on 4 April 2019 at 14:18 UTC. On 11 April 2019, during the landing procedure, a problem occurred in the final minutes of flight. Communications were lost with the spacecraft, long enough for the braking process to fail, and the vehicle crashed on the lunar surface. The Beresheet mission had included plans to measure the Moon's magnetic field at the landing site, and was carrying a laser retroreflector, and a "time capsule" containing analog and digital information, created by the Arch Mission Foundation. Beresheet was the first Israeli spacecraft to travel beyond Earth's orbit and was the first privately funded landing on the Moon. Though the spacecraft crashed, Israel became the seventh country to make lunar orbit and the fourth country, after the Soviet Union, the United States, and China to attempt a soft landing on the Moon.

Two days after the failed attempt to soft land on the Moon, SpaceIL announced plans for a second attempt, Beresheet 2.

The SpaceIL team was founded as a nonprofit organization wishing to promote scientific and technological education in Israel.

History
SpaceIL began as part of the Google Lunar X Prize (GLXP), which offered  in prizes to inspire teams to develop low-cost methods of robotic space exploration. The SpaceIL entry was unique among GLXP contenders, in that instead of building a tracked or wheeled rover, SpaceIL planned to meet the requirement to travel  on the lunar surface by having the lander "hop" using rocket engine propulsion from its landing site to another site more than 500 meters away.

In April 2014, American philanthropist Sheldon Adelson donated  to the project, and in June 2017, the Israeli Space Agency (ISA) announced a donation of additional 7.5 million ILS, after having donated 2 million ILS in previous years.

By June 2017, the lander spacecraft was undergoing integration and testing, and in August 2017, Google Lunar XPrize announced an extension of the prize competition deadline to 31 March 2018, but the contest ended without a winner as no team launched before the deadline. Nevertheless, SpaceIL continued development and fabrication.

In November 2017, SpaceIL announced that they needed  to finish the project. Morris Kahn resigned from chairing the board, and promised $10M if the organization could raise the additional $20M. The amount required was produced by a few major donors.

By January 2019, testing was complete and the spacecraft was delivered to Cape Canaveral, Florida in preparation for launch on a SpaceX Falcon 9 launch vehicle. The mission was successfully launched on 22 February 2019.

The current CEO is Ido Anteby, and the President of SpaceIL remains Morris Kahn.

On 11 April 2019, when its main engine malfunctioned during descent, the lander crashed on the Moon's surface. Though the mission ultimately failed, Israel was the seventh country to have a spacecraft orbit the Moon.

Founders and supporters
The cofounders of the team were Yariv Bash, former electronics and computer engineer in the Interdisciplinary Center in Herzliya, and currently Flytrex CEO; Kfir Damari, a Computer Networking lecturer and entrepreneur; and Yonatan Winetraub, formerly a satellite systems engineer at Israel Aerospace Industries and currently a biophysics PhD candidate at Stanford University. Morris Kahn is the chairman of the public board and donated  to the project.

The team has technical support from the Israel Space Agency (ISA), Israel Aerospace Industries, Rafael Systems and Elbit Systems. SpaceIL is also supported by educational institutions, including the Technion, Tel Aviv University, Weizmann Institute of Science and Ben-Gurion University of the Negev. SpaceIL has over 200 members, 95% of them are volunteers. The founders of the team stated that if they had won the competition, the money would have been donated to educational purposes.

After building the Beresheet lunar lander, its prime contractor Israel Aerospace Industries is contemplating the possibility to build several commercial landers.

Beresheet 

Beresheet was a demonstrator of a small robotic lunar lander.  Its aims included promoting careers in science, technology, engineering, and mathematics (STEM); and landing its magnetometer and laser retroreflector on the Moon.

The lander was previously known as Sparrow, and was officially named Beresheet ("Genesis") in December 2018. Size-wise, it had been compared to a washing machine. It used seven ground stations, globally, for Earth-lander communication. Its Mission Control room is at Israel Aerospace Industries in Yehud, Israel.

Payload
The spacecraft carried a "time capsule" created by the Arch Mission Foundation, containing over 30 million pages of analog and digital data, including a full copy of the English-language Wikipedia, the Wearable Rosetta disc, the PanLex database, the Torah, children's drawings, a children's book inspired by the space launch, memoirs of a Holocaust survivor, Israel's national anthem (Hatikvah), the Israeli flag, and a copy of the Israeli Declaration of Independence.

Its scientific payload included a magnetometer supplied by the Israeli Weizmann Institute of Science to measure the local magnetic field, and a laser retroreflector array supplied by NASA's Goddard Space Flight Center to enable precise measurements of the Earth–Moon distance.

Propulsion
The spacecraft featured one LEROS 2b liquid-propellant, restartable rocket engine, using monomethylhydrazine (MMH) fuel and mixed oxides of nitrogen (MON) as oxidizer. This single engine was used to reach lunar orbit, as well as for deceleration and propulsive landing.

Launch 
In October 2015, SpaceIL signed a contract for a launch from Cape Canaveral in Florida on a SpaceX Falcon 9 booster, via Spaceflight Industries. It was launched on 22 February 2019 at 0145 UTC (20:45 local time on 21 February) as a secondary payload, along with the telecom satellite Nusantara Satu (formally PSN-6). Beresheet is being controlled by a command center in Yehud, Israel.

From 24 February to 19 March, the main engine was used four times for orbit raising, putting its apogee close to the Moon's orbital distance. The spacecraft performed maneuvers so as to be successfully captured into an elliptical lunar orbit on 4 April 2019, and then adjusted its flight pattern into a circular orbit around the Moon.  Once in the correct circular orbit, it was intended for the craft to decelerate for a soft landing on the lunar surface on 11 April 2019.

Landing plan 

Beresheet was to operate for an estimated two Earth days on the lunar surface, as it had no thermal control and was expected to quickly overheat. However, its laser retroreflector was a passive device requiring no electrical power and was expected to be functional for several decades.

Failed landing 

On 11 April 2019, at approximately 1900 UTC, the lander began its de-orbit and landing procedure. Within minutes before the expected landing, mission control received a "selfie" photograph from the probe with the lunar surface visible in the background. During the braking procedure on approach to the landing site, the craft's main engine stopped operating. The engine was brought back online following a system reset; however, the craft had already lost too much altitude to slow its descent sufficiently. The spacecraft arrived at the surface of the moon, but at a speed and angle that did not allow for a soft landing. Having apparently crashed, communication with the lander ended. SpaceIL announced the failure at 19:25 UTC.

Beresheet 2 

On 13 April 2019, SpaceIL announced plans for a second attempt to the Moon, Beresheet 2, but on 26 June 2019 SpaceIL said in a statement that the second mission will not target the Moon, and instead it will be to another undisclosed object.

On 5 February 2020 Shimon Sarid was appointed as CEO of SpaceIL. In this role Sarid will lead the Beresheet 2 project with the goal of getting an unmanned spacecraft to the Moon; and soft-landing it.

References

External links
Official website
Beresheet orbit tracking

Google Lunar X Prize
Exploration of the Moon
Lunar science
Space program of Israel
Technology companies of Israel
Technology companies established in 2011
2011 establishments in Israel
Tel Aviv University
Companies based in Tel Aviv